Zagwiździe  (German Friedrichsthal) is a village in the administrative district of Gmina Murów, within Opole County, Opole Voivodeship, Silesia in south-western Poland.

Notable residents
 Johann Friedrich Krigar (1774-1852) 
 Walter von Hippel (1897–1972), Luftwaffe general

References

Villages in Opole County